Alfred Clarke may refer to:

 Alfred Clarke (Australian cricketer) (1868–1940), Australian cricketer
 Alfred Clarke (Nottinghamshire cricketer) (1831–1878), English cricketer
 Alfred Clarke (Surrey cricketer) (1865–1935), English cricketer
 Alfred Clarke (1848–1925), English mycologist
 Alfie Clarke (1914–1953), Welsh footballer
 Alfred E. Clarke Mansion, a Victorian house in San Francisco, California
 Alfred Henry Clarke (1860–1942), Canadian politician
 Alfred Rutter Clarke (1867–1932), Australian stockbroker and investor